Porky's Pooch is a 1941 Warner Bros. Looney Tunes cartoon directed by Bob Clampett. The short was released on December 27, 1941, and stars Porky Pig.

This is the last short Bob Clampett directed that used his old unit, which would ultimately be inherited by Norman McCabe the same year. Clampett directed shorts using Tex Avery's former unit from this point forward.

The short was remade in 1947 as Chuck Jones's Little Orphan Airedale, which introduced the finalized and recognizable character of Charlie Dog, although it was confirmed that the dog in this cartoon is actually Charlie dog's first prototype.

Plot
The short begins at a view of the city until it fades to a building called "All Americans Grill". A Scottie dog Sandy is starving as he watched a worker, who appears to be a dog, flipping pancakes. He looks at a belt with words. He tightens himself reading "Empty".  Sandy then walks until his he asks his friend, Rover what he's doing in a car. Sandy then greets Rover and tells Rover that he's in a street of hard luck (with stutters). Rover tells him how he got a master. In his flashback, Rover goes inside Porky's apartment and goes up an elevator to his room while he's taking a bath. He puts on a towel and answers the door angrily. Rover walks in and says "you ain't got no dog, and I ain't got no master"! As he proposes to be Porky's pet. Rover then jumps onto Porky's arms and kisses Porky. Porky can't handle his actions and doesn't want one, and kicks him out. Porky then reliefs himself, but then Rover bangs on the door again and Porky gets it. The Rover continues to hit but immediately hits Porky's head a couple of times. Rover then tells him that Rover had a lot of tricks. But Rover then immediately plays dead afterwards. And lastly, He tries to do a different type of act, by acting like a gong. Rover than however gets on Porky's arms again with a kiss. Porky is not impressed with Rover's talents, carries him out of his apartment and drops him off the stair banister. He runs back to his room panting along with Rover near him. Then Rover flicks Porky's snout and dresses up like Carmen Miranda and sings Mi Caballero (done by Sara Berner), by M.K. Jerome and Jack Scholl. Porky then starts to get even more angrier, just throws him out. After a second, Rover walks back in yelling Porky doesn't want him. He becomes sorrowful and walks over to the window. He pretends to jump to end his life. Porky runs over in shock. He tries to look for Rover, but he sees Rover lying on the edge. Porky shuts the window while Rover looks angrily at Porky. He then tries to bang on the window with Porky, hands-crossed. he stops banging afterwards, and tries to yell but muted. Another thing came out-of-the-blue as he pretends that he's going to fall. He tries to get Porky's attention, as he performs a couple of dances but immediately fails after he almost fell off. But he actually does lose a lot of balance afterwards. Porky opens the window, and tells Rover to not do what he is doing. He immediately yells "watch out" until Rover screams in pain as he begins to fall. Porky immediately then runs down the stairs. Rover however, then was shown falling down and praying. Porky however then arrives at the entrance of the hotel as he tries to look around unbalanced in-order to catch him, but unfortunately misses. Porky weeps for Rover and tries to wake him up. Rover finally wakes up glad to see Porky, telling him "Gosh, I didn't know you cared!" and kisses him. Then he uses the famous catchphrase of Lou Costello, "I'm a bad boy!" as the cartoon ends.

Home media
Porky's Pooch is available in the Looney Tunes Golden Collection: Volume 5 and Porky Pig 101 DVD sets.

See also
Little Orphan Airedale
Looney Tunes and Merrie Melodies filmography (1940–1949)
List of Porky Pig cartoons

References

External links

Looney Tunes shorts
1941 films
1941 animated films
American black-and-white films
Films directed by Bob Clampett
1941 comedy films
1940s American animated films
Animated films about dogs
Porky Pig films
1940s English-language films
Charlie Dog films